Cecilio Nauzet Pérez González (born 1 March 1985), known simply as Nauzet, is a Spanish professional footballer who plays as a goalkeeper for CD La Cuadra.

Club career
Born in Las Palmas, Canary Islands, Nauzet started his career with CD Maspalomas, before moving to local rivals UD Las Palmas to finish his development. In the 2002–03 season, aged 17, he played three games with the first team in the Segunda División, his first appearance being on 31 August 2002 in a 2–0 home win against Racing de Ferrol.

After a loan spell in the Segunda División B with UE Lleida, Nauzet returned to the second division for the 2005–06 campaign, being backup with Málaga CF's reserves and suffering team relegation. He left the club in late January 2007 and continued his career in division three, appearing for five teams and being relegated with CD Orientación Marítima and UD Fuerteventura; during his spell with the latter, on 5 October 2008, he scored from a goal kick in the 2–0 away victory over Águilas CF.

Nauzet left AD Ceuta in December 2010, as both parties agreed on terminating the contract. On 23 February of the following year, he signed with Swedish club Halmstads BK.

On 29 May 2011, both Nauzet and countryman Iván Díaz were released by Halmstads; it was announced that several factors both on and off the pitch were the reason for the rescision. He returned to his country in the summer, joining third-tier CD Mirandés and being an instrumental part in the side's semi-final run in the Copa del Rey.

In 2012, Nauzet moved to CE Sabadell FC of the second division. On 27 July 2015, after the side's relegation, he agreed to a one-year contract at CA Osasuna in the same league.

Nauzet played all the matches and minutes in 2015–16, as the Navarrese returned to La Liga after two years. On 14 July 2016 he agreed to a new two-year deal, making his debut in the competition on 19 August at the age of 31 when he started a 1–1 away draw against Málaga CF.

On 28 July 2017, after suffering immediate relegation, Nauzet terminated his contract with Osasuna. On 22 October, he signed with Cypriot club APOEL FC where he shared teams with compatriots Roberto Lago and Jesús Rueda. His maiden appearance in the UEFA Champions League took place on 1 November, when he helped to a 1–1 group stage away draw with Borussia Dortmund.

References

External links

1985 births
Living people
Spanish footballers
Footballers from Las Palmas
Association football goalkeepers
La Liga players
Segunda División players
Segunda División B players
Primera Federación players
Tercera Federación players
UD Las Palmas players
UE Lleida players
Atlético Malagueño players
Real Jaén footballers
RCD Mallorca B players
AD Ceuta footballers
CD Mirandés footballers
CE Sabadell FC footballers
CA Osasuna players
Recreativo de Huelva players
Linares Deportivo footballers
Allsvenskan players
Halmstads BK players
Cypriot First Division players
APOEL FC players
Spain youth international footballers
Spanish expatriate footballers
Expatriate footballers in Sweden
Expatriate footballers in Cyprus
Spanish expatriate sportspeople in Sweden
Spanish expatriate sportspeople in Cyprus